Mikhail Viktorovich Chernomyrdin (born 4 March 1999) is a Russian football player who plays for FC Zenit-2 St. Petersburg. He was previously known as Mikhail Pogorelov and changed his last name in the winter of 2022.

Club career
He was called up to the main squad of FC Zenit Saint Petersburg once in February 2021, for a Russian Cup game against FC Arsenal Tula, but remained on the bench.

He made his debut in the Russian Football National League for FC Olimp-Dolgoprudny on 17 July 2021 in a game against FC Rotor Volgograd.

On 28 January 2022, he returned to FC Zenit-2 St. Petersburg.

References

External links
 
 Profile by Russian Football National League

1999 births
Sportspeople from Volgograd
Living people
Russian footballers
Association football midfielders
FC Strogino Moscow players
FC Zenit Saint Petersburg players
FC Zenit-2 Saint Petersburg players
FC Olimp-Dolgoprudny players
Russian Second League players
Russian First League players